The 1995–96 Nemzeti Bajnokság I, also known as NB I, was the 94th season of top-tier football in Hungary. The season started on 4 August 1995 and ended on 24 June 1996.

Overview
It was contested by 16 teams, and Ferencvárosi TC won the championship.

League standings

Results

Relegation play-offs 

|}

Statistical leaders

Top goalscorers

See also
1995–96 Magyar Kupa

References
 Hungary - List of final tables (RSSSF)

Nemzeti Bajnokság I seasons
1
Hun